Ptomascopus is a genus of beetles in the subfamily Nicrophorinae that contains the following species:

Ptomascopus morio Kraatz, 1877
Ptomascopus plagiatus Ménétriés, 1854
Ptomascopus zhangla Háva, Schneider & Růžička, 1999
 Ptomascopus aveyronensis Flach, 1890

References

Silphidae